This is a list of radio stations in the Bicol Region, which is located at the Southeastern Luzon and in the northeastern Philippines. It includes the cities of Masbate, Sorsogon, Legazpi, Ligao, Tabaco, Iriga and Naga.

Albay

AM Stations

FM Stations

Internet radio stations

Camarines Norte

AM Stations

FM Stations

Camarines Sur

AM Stations

FM Stations

Internet Radio Stations

Catanduanes

FM Stations

Masbate

AM Stations

FM Stations

Sorsogon

AM Stations

FM Stations

References

Bicol Region
Radio stations